Sommen is a locality situated in Tranås Municipality, Jönköping County, Sweden with 772 inhabitants in 2010. It is located at the northwestern end of the lake with which it shares its name.

References

External links 

Populated lakeshore places in Sweden
Populated places in Jönköping County
Populated places in Tranås Municipality
Sommen